Amesemi is a Kushite protective goddess and wife of Apedemak, the lion-god. She was represented with a crown shaped as a falcon, or with a crescent moon on her head on top of which a falcon was standing. The clothing that Amesemi is seen wearing is a robe that is made from cloth and is worn over her undergarments. She is also often seen wearing a short necklace with large beads. She is often seen depicted as holding a second set of hands with her.

In the north-front reliefs of the Lion Temple in Naqa she appears together with Isis, Mut, Hathor and Satet. Compared to the goddesses of ancient Egyptian origin Amesemi appears to be much more corpulent, which is typical for the representation of women in Meroe.  On stelae in the temple of Amun in Naqa she is shown together with the Kandake Amanishakheto.

Sites with references to Amesemi

Musawwarat es Sufra 
The oldest mention of Amesemi comes from Musawwarat es Sufra, from the late third century BCE. In Musawwarat es Sufra, she is mentioned six times in the Lion Temple in images. In these images, she is beside her husband Apedemak. On the exterior north wall, she is seen wearing a dress that is different from later illustration of her. This difference occurred because a standard of her appearance was not established at the time of King Arnekhamani, which was the time when the temple was built. The image of her on the wall also contains an inscription in Egyptian hieroglyphs which reads "'Jmsm – Amesemi". Amesemi is mentioned once at the Great Enclosure where she is touching her husband's shoulder.

The Temples of Naqa 
Temple F in the ancient town of Naqa, also known as Naga, has the earliest portrayals of Amesmi in Naga. These depictions were made between 170 and 150 BCE. She is depicted at the southern end of the interior south-east wall. She is standing behind an enthroned Apedemak and is touching his head. In the Lion Temple of Naga, she is depicted at least two times and there is an image of her on the exterior north wall which contains an inscription which translates to "“Oh Amesemi, who is in [.]mami[.], may she give them life, oh Amesemi.” In the Great Amun Temple Naga, the goddess is found in the hypostyle. In this image, Amanitore is seen adoring the goddess. There are not any other depictions of Amesemi in the Great Amun Temple in Naga but it is possible that there were paintings of the goddess during the use of this temple. In the smaller temple of Amun, Amesemi is illustrated on the exterior west wall with her husband. She appears here a second time, but this time she is with who is assumed to be Amun-Apedemak. Amesemi appears in a few other places in this site including many different stelae found.

Other depictions of Amesemi 
Amesemi is found at the Amun Temple of Amara in an art piece. Here she is getting offered a bowl by Prince Sorakarora. The Goddess is also portrayed in the kiosk of Natakamani and Amanitore, where she is behind the Lion God. The Goddess was also found depicted in smaller objects. She was found imaged in a seal impression alongside her husband. She was also found in different types of jewelry including: beads, armlets and ring plates.

References

Nubian goddesses
Egyptian goddesses
Tutelary goddesses
Falcon deities